Beat Jans (born 12 July 1964, Basel) is a Swiss politician of the Social Democratic Party (SP) and a member of the National Council of Switzerland.

Education 
He completed his apprenticeship as a farmer in 1985 and followed up on his studies at the Technical college for tropical agriculture from where he graduated as an agricultural technician in 1987. He graduated in Environmental Sciences from the Swiss Federal Institute of Technology (ETH) in Zurich in 1994.

Professional career  
He was involved in the development projects of the Swiss  in Paraguay and Haiti between 1987 and 1989 and was a member of the board at Pro Natura between 2000 and 2010, when he resigned to assume office as a member of the National Council of Switzerland.

Political career 
Jans joined the SP in 1998 and became a member of the Grand Council of Basel Stadt in 2001. In the Grand Council, he was a member of the Commission of Economics and Taxes. He remained a member of the Grand Council after he joined the National Council of Switzerland in 2010 succeeding Ruedi Rechsteiner and only resigned in 2011. He was re-elected to the National Council in the federal elections in 2011, 2015 and 2019. In the National Council, he was also member of the Commission of Economics and Taxes. As it became clear that Anita Fetz would not stand for another term in the Council of States for Basel-Stadt, he put himself forward as a candidate, but later withdrew to enable a female candidate for the SP. He was again a candidate for the National Council and Eva Herzog for the Council of States. Both candidacies were successful in the October 2019 federal elections. 

He was elected vice-president of the SP in 2015, succeeding Jaqueline Fehr, but resigned in 2015 when the party abolished the offices of the president and vice-president and instituted a co-presidency of Mattea Meyer and Cédric Wermuth. 

He was elected into the executive council of Basel Stadt on the 25 October 2020 and as its president in November 2020. Sarah Wyss of the SP succeeded him, after he resigned as a member of the national council in December 2020.

Personal life 
Jans is married and is the father of two daughters.

References 

Swiss politicians
Members of the National Council (Switzerland)
1964 births
Social Democratic Party of Switzerland politicians
Living people
Politicians from Basel-Stadt